Gajukhel (Urdu: کاجو خیل) also known as Gaju Kehl is a village located about 1.5 km from the Nizampur main bazaar. The village provides a gateway to Nowshera. A highway links Nowshera to Nizampur via Gajukhel.

Villages in Pakistan